Albrecht Penck Glacier is a glacier between the Fry Glacier and the Evans Piedmont Glacier, draining northeast toward Tripp Bay on the coast of Victoria Land, Antarctica. It was first charted by the British Antarctic Expedition (1907–09) which named this feature for Albrecht Penck, the Director of the Institute of Oceanography and of the Geographical Institute in Berlin.

See also
 List of glaciers in the Antarctic
 Glaciology

References

Glaciers of Scott Coast